Grapplers Quest is an organization mainly concerned with the promotion of Grappling (submission wrestling) and Brazilian Jiu-Jitsu tournaments. Founded in 1998 by Brian Cimins, Grapplers Quest hosts competitions of various division, age, and weight classes.

Grapplers Quest has been host to many high-level competitors in mixed martial arts, such as Matt Hughes, Frankie Edgar, Ben Henderson, Kenny Florian, Diego Sanchez, Joe Stevenson, BJ Penn, and Brandon Vera.

History 
Grapplers Quest, as part of the Grapplers Company, Inc., was founded by Brian Cimins for his Senior Marketing and Public Relations Thesis at the Richard Stockton College of New Jersey in 1996. The first Grapplers Quest was held on April 24, 1999 at Montclair High School in Montclair, New Jersey.

The organization has also branched out to form partnerships with the Ultimate Fighting Championship and the non-profit AutismRadio.org, among others.

Divisions 

The following is a sample of the divisions used by Grapplers Quest divided into their respective weight brackets.

Youth

Women

Men

Rules

No-Gi 

Grapplers Quest uses a scoring system similar to that used by the ADCC Submission Wrestling World Championship. Unlike the ADCC however, there is a use of advantage points to determine the winner of a match rather than force a judges' decision. Also unlike the ADCC, Grapplers Quest restricts the use of certain leg lock techniques to particular divisions.

The following is a list of the standard match times for each no-gi division.

Brazilian Jiu-Jitsu 
Grapplers Quest uses a simplified version of the IBJJF scoring system for Brazilian Jiu-Jitsu matches, though one which still retains the use of subjective advantage points. Similarly to the no-gi divisions, there is a restriction of certain leg lock techniques to differing divisions.

The following is a list of the standard match times for each Brazilian Jiu-Jitsu division.

Results

Overall Team Results 2011

The following are the team results from 2011 World Series of Grappling, presented by Grapplers Quest.

Overall Team Results 2010

The following are the team results from 2010 World Series of Grappling, presented by Grapplers Quest and Revgear.

References

External links 
 Grapplersquest.com - Official Grapplers Quest Website
 AutismRadio.org - Non-profit organization that provides support to Autism patients
 Sherdog.com Sherdog search for Grapplers Quest
 Journey to the Grapplers Quest
 Interview with Brian Cimins, Grapplers Quest founder

Brazilian jiu-jitsu competitions
Grappling competitions
1998 establishments in the United States
Sports leagues established in 1998